Yaphank is a station in the hamlet of Yaphank, New York on the Main Line (Greenport Branch) of the Long Island Rail Road. It is located on Park Street near Suffolk County Road 21 (Yaphank Avenue). It is also accessible from streets in and around Suffolk County. Government buildings are located on the north side of the tracks at the bottom of the Yaphank Avenue overpass.

The two sites that are closest to the station are the Suffolk County Police Department auto mechanics shop (a.k.a. "Vector Center") as well as a Georgia-Pacific railroad lumber yard. The historic Suffolk County Almshouse Barn and the former Suffolk County Sanitorium can be found northwest of the station, as well as the Yaphank Avenue bridge over the tracks.

History
Yaphank station was originally built as Milleville station in 1845, and was spelled both as Millville or Milleville on LIRR timetables. It was renamed Yaphank a year later, and has kept that name ever since. The station also included a hotel until December 1873. Yaphank station was replaced by a second station building in 1875 that contained elaborate gingerbread woodwork. Before World War II, Yaphank station was known as the stop for the "Camp Siegfried Special", a train that took members of the German American Bund from parts of New York City to an infamous Hitler Youth camp known as Camp Siegfried. The decorative features were reduced considerably in June 1941, and then the station house was closed in 1958 and burned down in 1961. After this, it was little more than a sheltered platform surrounded by concrete. During the late-1970s, it became the stop for special trains with a connecting bus to Parr Meadows Racetrack. High-level platforms replaced this configuration during the 1990s.

This station will be replaced by a stop in East Yaphank, which will better serve the local community and will also serve Brookhaven National Laboratory.

Carman's River station
Just east of Yaphank station, another station in Yaphank, Carman's River station, opened on June 26, 1844. It served as the temporary terminus of the LIRR main line until Manorville and Riverhead stations were built in 1845. The station was removed from the June 14, 1845 timetable.

Station layout
This station has one high-level side platform north of the track that is long enough for one and a half cars to receive and discharge passengers.

References

External links 

Unofficial LIRR History Website
Yaphank Station, 1973 and July 1992 Photos
NYA &  LIRR at YAPHANK STATION (Webshots.com)
Unofficial LIRR Photography Site (lirrpics.com)
Yaphank Station
 Station from Yaphank Avenue from Google Maps Street View

Long Island Rail Road stations in Suffolk County, New York
Brookhaven, New York
Railway stations in the United States opened in 1845